This is a list of women's football clubs in Hong Kong.
 Hong Kong Football Club
 Kitchee
 Citizen
 Chelsea FC Soccer School HK 
 Tai Po
 Resource Capital
 Hong Kong Baptist University
 Hong Kong Wonderful FC
 Wong Tai Sin
 WSE
 Wing Go
 Happy Valley
 Shatin

APSS (Asia Pacific Soccer Schools), KCC (Kowloon Cricket Club) Youth football for girls aged 5-18yrs.

See also
List of women's football clubs

External links
Shatin Sports Association
The Hong Kong Ladies Football Association Limited

Hong Kong women
Women's football clubs
 
clubs